Krist Raj Higher Secondary School (or Krist Raj HSS/KRHSS ) is one of the oldest schools in Kollam District, India, situated about 1 km east of Kollam Junction Railway Station. Built in the year 1948, the school serves students from 5th Standard to Higher Secondary level.

Establishment
Krist Raj HSS was founded by the late Bishop of Quilon Rt. Rev. Dr. Jerome. M. Fernandez (in office from 1937-1978) in 1948. The 'Main Block' i.e. the first and oldest block in the school, is still in place and the auditorium above the building is often used for classes.

Higher Secondary

The Golden Jubilee Block which serves the Higher Secondary section of Krist Raj Higher Secondary School, was built in 1998. Biology Science, Commerce, and Humanities were the courses offered first. In 2011, a Computer Science batch was added . It is the only Higher Secondary school in Kollam district which offers French as second language. A new block named Rosa Mystica Block was built in 2012.

Notable alumni 

 Dr. Christy Fernandez, IAS. Former Secretary to the President of India
 Babu Divakaran, politician and former minister of Kerala government
 Anil Xavier, IAS, District Collector of Palaghat 
 Dr. John Zachariah
Dr. A. V. George, Member,Kerala State Commission for Backward Classes
 Prof. Paul Varghese

Principals 
The principals of the Krist Raj school

 1948 - Emmanual Chacho
 Fr. C.M George
 G Peter
 Jacob Jhon
 Kurien
 Thomas P.K
 Fr Gracian Fernadaz
 Thomas TL
 Joseph Kadavil
 Francis J
 Sreedharan Achari
 Anastas P
Pius M.C
 1994 - Bruno M Fernandaz
 Jhon N J
 John Domascene
 Agnes Daniel
 Francis G
 Roy Sebastian
 Thomas More
 Francis G

References

High schools and secondary schools in Kerala
Christian schools in Kerala
Schools in Kollam district
Educational institutions established in 1948
1948 establishments in India